Big Tymers (stylized as Big Tymer$) was an American musical duo active from 1997 to 2005 and again in 2018-2018 from New Orleans, Louisiana consisting of Cash Money Records co-founder Baby and former Cash Money in-house producer Mannie Fresh. Baby later changed his stage name to Birdman after the duo dissolved in 2005. Big Tymers released their debut album in 1997 titled How You Luv That.

In 2018, the duo reunited for a song called "Designer Caskets" on the Cash Money soundtrack album Before Anythang.

They recorded their first Platinum-selling album in 2000 titled I Got That Work. The lead single from I Got That Work, "Number One Stunna" peaked at No. 24 on the Billboard Hot R&B/Hip-Hop Singles & Tracks. The group released its most successful album in 2002 titled Hood Rich. The album reached No. 1 on the Billboard Hot 200 and spawned a major hit in "Still Fly" which reached No. 11 on the Billboard Hot 100. The group later recorded their final album titled Big Money Heavyweight in 2003. In 2005, Mannie Fresh resigned from Cash Money because of a financial dispute with Birdman, and his brother Slim. During an appearance on MTV RapFix, Lil Wayne announced that there will be a Big Tymers album featuring Birdman, himself, and Drake. Birdman stated that Mannie Fresh will not be a part of the project.

History
The duo recorded their first album How You Luv That in 1997 featuring all of the rappers on Cash Money Records including B.G. and Juvenile. The album reached a peak of No. 25 of the R&B/hip hop chart and the lower reaches of the Billboard 200. Cash Money re-released How You Luv That as How You Luv That Vol. 2 in late 1998 after signing its distribution deal with Universal Records. This re-release substitutes a remix of "Stun'n" for the original version and adds "Big Ballin'", "Money & Power", and "Drop It Like It's Hot. How You Luv That Vol. 2 almost reached the top 100 of the Billboard album chart and reached the top 20 of the Billboard R&B and hip hop chart.

Their second album I Got That Work released in 2000 reached the top 5 of the US album chart and topped the US R&B/hip hop chart. This album spawned two big hits in "Get Your Roll On" and "#1 Stunna" reaching the top 30 on the R&B singles charts.

Hood Rich released in 2002 topped both the US album and R&B charts. "Still Fly" from the album reached the top 20 on the R&B singles charts and No. 11 on the pop charts. "Oh Yeah" reached the top 50 of the Billboard Hot 100 and the top 30 of the R&B/hip hop charts.

Big Money Heavyweight in 2003 was not as successful reaching No. 21 on the album charts and top ten in the R&B charts. A remix album made the lower reaches of the R&B/hip hop charts in 2004. "Gangsta Girl" from the album made the lower reaches of the Billboard Hot 100 and the top 40 of the R&B charts.

In 2005, it was announced that Mannie Fresh was leaving Cash Money Records and signing with Def Jam Records. His departure has left the duo's future in question.

As of May 2013, Birdman, Lil Wayne and Drake have been in talks of restarting the group with an upcoming album, while original member Mannie Fresh would not be included. While doing promotion for the Rich Gang, Birdman indicated that a Big Tymers single would be released in Fall of 2013 with a possibility that Mannie Fresh may also be involved with the album.

In 2018, the duo reunited on a new track called "Designer Caskets" (it being their first song in 14 years) for the soundtrack of the Before Anythang: The Cash Money Story documentary.

Discography

Studio albums
 How You Luv That (1997)
 I Got That Work (2000)
 Hood Rich (2002)
 Big Money Heavyweight (2003)

Collaboration albums
 Baller Blockin' with Cash Money Millionaires (2000)

Compilation albums
 How You Luv That Vol. 2 (1998)

Filmography
 Baller Blockin' (2000)

References

External links
Cash Money Records website
MTV Big Tymers page
Big Tymers fan website

Cash Money Records artists
African-American musical groups
American musical duos
Southern hip hop groups
Musical groups from New Orleans
Hip hop duos